The Atlantic batfish (Dibranchus atlanticus) is a species of fish in the family Ogcocephalidae. It is found in deep water in the Atlantic Ocean where it lives on the seabed, feeding on small invertebrates.

Description
The dorsal fin, which is set far back near the tail, has no spines and five to seven soft rays, and the anal fin has no spines and four soft rays. The pectoral fins are robust and held at right angles to the body; they are limb-like and are used to "walk" over the seabed, and the more slender pelvic fins serve the same purpose. Under the operculum there is a sturdy multi-pointed spine. The bases of the fins, apart from the dorsal fin, are decorated with tubercles (cone-shaped scales) and the ventral surface of the disc is covered by distinct scales. The dorsal surface of the fish is usually a uniform reddish-grey, but specimens in the eastern Atlantic sometimes have reticulated markings. The ventral surface is paler.

Distribution and habitat
D. atlanticus is found in both the western and eastern Atlantic Ocean. Its range extends from the coasts of Canada and the United States, southwards through the Caribbean Sea and Gulf of Mexico to South America, as far south as Rio de Janeiro. In the eastern Atlantic its range includes northwestern Ireland and extends southwards to the Gulf of Guinea and Angola. It is a bathypelagic species found on the seabed on muddy and sandy sediments.

Biology
This fish may be bioluminescent, as there has been a report that in the laboratory, its skin can emit flashes of light when stimulated with peroxidase, but this effect has not been observed in living specimens. It lures prey to the vicinity of its mouth; its diet consists of small invertebrates such as polychaete worms, amphipods, clams, starfish, brittle stars and sea spiders.

Status
This deep sea fish is of no interest to commercial fisheries but it is often caught in deep water trawl surveys and appears to be common. The International Union for Conservation of Nature has listed it as being a "least-concern species".

References

Atlantic batfish
Fish of the Atlantic Ocean
Atlantic batfish
Taxa named by Wilhelm Peters